The RD-58 (manufacturer designation 11D58) is a rocket engine, developed in the 1960s by OKB-1, now RKK Energia.  The project was managed by Mikhail Melnikov, and it was based on the previous S1.5400 which was the first staged combustion engine in the world. The engine was initially created to power the Block D stage of the Soviet Union's abortive N-1 rocket. Derivatives of this stage are now used as upper stages on some Proton and Zenit rockets. An alternative version of the RD-58 chamber, featuring a shorter nozzle, was used as the N-1's roll-control engine.

The RD-58 uses LOX as the oxidizer and RG-1 as fuel in an oxidizer rich staged combustion cycle. It features a single gimbaled chamber, radial centrifugal pumps with auxiliary booster pumps, and an oxygen-rich preburner. Recent modifications include a lightweight carbon-composite nozzle extender developed by NPO Iskra.

The Buran spacecraft used two of an evolution of the RD-58M, called 17D12, as its main orbital correction engines. Instead of RG-1, it burned Syntin, and could be ignited 15 times. It is assumed that it was the base for the RD-58S, which had practically the same specifications and powered the Blok DM-2M. But the manufacturer states that the engine is compatible with both propellants.

The current version of the engine is the RD-58M (manufacturer designation 11D58M), which has slightly reduced thrust, but increased isp. An even newer version is under development and is known as the RD-58MF (manufacturer designation 11D58MF). This will enable it to gain 20s of isp (to an expected 372s). It will eventually fly on the Blok DM-03. This new version of the engine will be built in the Krasnoyarsk Machine-Building Plant. During a November 2014 interview, Vladimir Kolmykov, the Deputy General Director of the Chemical Division of Krasnoyarsk Machine-Building Plant, stated that the production of Block-DM was suspended during that year, but work on the stage and development of the RD-58MF will resume during 2015.

Versions
This engine has had many versions through the years:
 RD-58 (GRAU Index 11D58): Original version developed for the Blok D of the N1 (rocket).
 RD-58M (GRAU Index 11D58M): Improved version developed for the Proton (rocket) Blok D.
 RD-58M (Carbon-carbon nozzle): Version of the RD-58M that replaces the regeneratively cooled nozzle for a carbon-carbon extension manufactured by NPO Iskra. Used on Zenit-3SL's Blok DM-SL since June 10, 2003 on the Thuraya 2 launch.
 RD-58MF (GRAU Index 11D58MF): Reduced thrust and increased specific impulse version expected to fly on the Proton and Zenit (rocket) Blok DM-03. Will probably also use a carbon-carbon nozzle extension.
 RD-58S (GRAU Index 11D58S): Version designed to use Syntin synthetic propellant rather than RG-1. Used on the Blok DM-2M. Probably developed based on the 17D12.
 RD-58Z (GRAU Index 11D58Z): Version adapted to the Zenit Blok DM-SL.
 17D12: Orbital maneuvering engines (DOM) of the Buran propulsion system 17D11, burned Syntin/LOX.

References

Rocket engines of the Soviet Union
Rocket engines of Russia
Rocket engines using kerosene propellant
Rocket engines using the staged combustion cycle
Energia rocket engines